Yara may refer to:

People 
 Yara (given name)
 Yara (surname), a Japanese surname
 Yara (singer) (born 1983), Lebanese pop singer
 Yara (footballer) (born 1964), Brazilian footballer

Locations 
 Yara, Cuba, a town and municipality in Granma province
 Yara, a rural village in Elb Adress, Trarza Region, Mauritania
 Yara, a fictional Caribbean island country that serves as the location for the first-person shooter Far Cry 6

Mythology  
 Yara (mythology), a figure in Brazilian mythology
 Yara-ma-yha-who, a legendary creature found in Australian Aboriginal mythology
 María Lionza, legendary figure in Venezuela whose is sometimes called Yara

Film and television 
 Yara (TV series), a 1979 Mexican television series
 The Wound (1998 film), a Turkish feature film originally titled Yara
 Yara, a 2018 Lebanese feature film a 2018 feature film written and directed by Abbas Fahdel
 Yara (2021 film), an Italian feature film
Yaara, 2020 Indian crime action film by Tigmanshu Dhulia

Other 
 YARA, a malware research tool
 Yara (genus), a genus of beetles
 Yara International, a Norwegian chemical company
 Yara International School, a private school in Riyadh, Saudi Arabia
 YARA, ICAO airport code for Ararat Airport, Victoria, Australia
 Yara, an evil character  in The Tower of the Elephant by Robert E. Howard

See also 
 Yarra (disambiguation)